Vivian Velez (born May 21, 1960) is a Filipina actress who previously served as Director General of Film Academy of the Philippines. As one of the radio host of the 8TriMedia's weekly program called 'DOUBLE V' and a DZRJ 810am's program called 'CHIT CHAT WITH DOUBLE V'. She was known as the "Ms. Body Beautiful" of Philippine movies in the 1980s. She won the Film Academy of the Philippines FAP Award for Best Actress in Pieta (1983) and FAMAS Award and Metro Manila Film Festival  for Best Actress in Paradise Inn (1985).

Career
Vivian Velez started her career in show business in 1976 when she was only 16 years old. She won the Film Academy of the Philippines (FAP) Award for Best Actress for Pieta (1983) and won two Best Actress Awards for her 1985 film Paradise Inn; one from FAMAS Awards and another from the Metro Manila Film Festival.

She performed her own stunts in Ang Babaing Hinugot sa Aking Tadyang (1981), directed by Carlo J. Caparas. In 1983, she appeared in Pieta with Ace Vergel and Charito Solis. In 1985, she finished four movies: Paradise Inn with Michael de Mesa, Ben Tumbling with Lito Lapid, Order To Kill with the former President Joseph Estrada, and Riot 1950 with Rudy Fernandez.

Her notable film Ang Babaing Hinugot sa Aking Tadyang (1981) has been remade as a GMA-7 TV series, starring Marian Rivera. She starred in the 2010 TV series Imortal (starring John Lloyd Cruz and Angel Locsin), and in the 2013 TV remake of Maria Mercedes (starring Jessy Mendiola), both shown on ABS-CBN.

Velez has appeared in more than 60 movies and television shows.

Velez publicly announced in March 2016 through her Facebook account, that she has irrevocably resigned from her show, Tubig at Langis due to the alleged rudeness and humiliation by her co-star Cristine Reyes against Velez during several tapings of the drama series.

Awards and nominations

Selected filmography

Television

Radio
Double V (DZRJ-AM/8TriMedia) (2017)
Chit Chat with Double V (DZRJ-AM Radyo Bandido TV) (2021)

Film
Black Mamba (1974)
Boss, Basta Ikaw (Wa 'Na 'Kong Sey) (1976)
Bata Pa si Sabel (1976)
Bago Lumamig ang Sabaw (1976)
Bertong Suklob (1976)
Inday Garutay (1976) 
Ligaw-tingin, Halik-hangin (1976)
BongBong (1976)
Escolta: Mayo 13... Biyernes ng Hapon (1976)
Andalucia (1976)
Puwede Ako, Puwede Ka Pa Ba? (1976)
Mag-ingat Ka... Ikaw ang Susunod! (1977)
Valentin Labrador: Muntinlupa Riot May 26, 1950 (1977)
Alas Tres ng Hapon... Lumuhod ang Maton! (1977)
Sila... sa Bawa't Bangketa (1977)
Mariposang Dagat (1977) - Mariposang Dagat
Beerhouse (1977)
Gameng (1977)
Babae... Ngayon at Kailanman (1977)
Blood Run (1978)
Basta Kabit May Sabit (1978)
Mula Ulo Hanggang Paa... Putik
Sari-saring Ibong Kulasisi (1978)
Batang City Jail (1978)
Ex-Convict (Naligaw Na Landas) (1978)
Ang Babaing Hinugot sa Aking Tadyang (1981)
Kahit Ako Ay Lupa (1981)
Ermitanyo (1981)
Pieta (1983)
Kumusta ka Hudas (1983)
Apoy sa Iyong Kandungan (1984)
Sampung Ahas ni Eva (1984)
Ben Tumbling (1985)
Paradise Inn (1985)
Kasalanan Bang Sambahin Ka? (1990)
Bikining Itim (1990)
Kailan Ka Magiging Akin (1991)
Kill Zone (1993)
Forever and a Day (2011)
On the Job (2013)

References

https://push.abs-cbn.com/2016/3/10/fresh-scoops/who-is-vivian-velez-5-things-to-know-about-ms-body-131755

External links

1968 births
20th-century Filipino actresses
21st-century Filipino actresses
Actresses from Cebu
Filipino women
Living people
People from Cebu City